Rasmus Quist Hansen (born 5 April 1980 in Middelfart), also known as Rasmus Quist, is a Danish rower and double World Champion in the lightweight double sculls, with his partner Mads Rasmussen.

Quist and Rasmussen placed first in the 2012 Summer Olympics in London, third in the 2008 Summer Olympics in Beijing and fourth in the 2004 Summer Olympics in Athens.

References
 
 
 

1980 births
Living people
People from Middelfart Municipality
Danish male rowers
Olympic rowers of Denmark
Rowers at the 2004 Summer Olympics
Rowers at the 2008 Summer Olympics
Rowers at the 2012 Summer Olympics
Rowers at the 2016 Summer Olympics
Olympic gold medalists for Denmark
Olympic bronze medalists for Denmark
Olympic medalists in rowing
Medalists at the 2012 Summer Olympics
Medalists at the 2008 Summer Olympics
World Rowing Championships medalists for Denmark
Sportspeople from the Region of Southern Denmark